"If It Weren't for Him" is a song written and recorded by American country music artists Vince Gill and Rosanne Cash.  It was released in June 1985 as the second single from Gill's album The Things That Matter.  The song reached #10 on the Billboard Hot Country Singles & Tracks chart.

Chart performance

References

1985 singles
1985 songs
Vince Gill songs
Rosanne Cash songs
Male–female vocal duets
Songs written by Vince Gill
Songs written by Rosanne Cash
Song recordings produced by Emory Gordy Jr.
RCA Records singles